Passage to the Other Side is the 4th studio album by Seven Witches; it's the first album with James Rivera singing, and the album also features bassist Joey Vera from Armored Saint.
Many fans consider this release to be the best of them all. The album features a cover of Def Leppard's song "Wasted" from their debut album, On Through the Night.

Track listing

Personnel
Seven Witches
James Rivera - vocals
Jack Frost - guitars, producer, engineer 
Joey Vera - bass, producer, engineer, mixing
Brian Craig - drums

Production
Don Sternecker – engineer

References

2003 albums
Seven Witches albums
Sanctuary Records albums
Noise Records albums